The Committee for the Coordination of Statistical Activities (CCSA) is composed of international and supranational organisations, whose mandate includes the provision of statistics. The CCSA promotes inter-agency coordination and cooperation on statistical programmes and consistency in statistical practices and development. As a forum of committed members, the CCSA fosters good practices in the statistical activities of international and supranational organisations, in accordance with the principles governing international statistical activities. The members of the CCSA contribute actively to the development of a coordinated global statistical system producing and disseminating high-quality statistics. 

The CCSA Secretariat and CCSA website are hosted by the United Nations Statistics Division (UNSD). The Committee meets twice a year and is represented by the top level of the statistical services of its member organisations.

Membership as of November 2014
African Development Bank (AfDB)
Arab Institute for Training and Research in Statistics (AITRS)
Asian Development Bank (ADB)
Bank for International Settlements (BIS) 
Caribbean Community (CARICOM)
European Central Bank (ECB) 
Food and Agriculture Organization of the United Nations (FAO)
Inter-American Development Bank (IDB)
International Atomic Energy Agency (IAEA)
International Civil Aviation Organization (ICAO)
International Labour Organization (ILO)
International Monetary Fund (IMF)
International Telecommunication Union (ITU) 
Interstate Statistical Committee of the Commonwealth of Independent States (CISSTAT)
Office for the Coordination of Humanitarian Affairs of the Secretariat (UNOCHA)
Office of the United Nations High Commissioner for Human Rights (OHCHR)
Organization for Economic Cooperation and Development (OECD)
PARIS21 (P21)
Statistical Centre for the Cooperation Council for the Arab Countries of the Gulf (GCC-Stat)
Statistical, Economic and Social Research and Training Centre for Islamic Countries (SESRIC)
Statistical Office of the European Union (EUROSTAT)
The Economic and Statistical Observatory of Sub-Saharan Africa (Afristat)
United Nations Children’s Fund (UNICEF)
United Nations Conference on Trade and Development (UNCTAD) 
United Nations Development Programme (UNDP)
United Nations Economic Commission for Africa (UNECA)
United Nations Economic Commission for Europe (UNECE)
United Nations Economic Commission for Latin America and the Caribbean (UNECLAC)
United Nations Economic and Social Commission for Asia and the Pacific (UNESCAP)
United Nations Economic and Social Commission for Western Asia (UNESCWA)
United Nations Educational, Scientific and Cultural Organization Institute for Statistics (UNESCO-IS)
United Nations Entity for Gender Equality and the Empowerment of Women (UN-Women)
United Nations Environment Programme (UNEP)
United Nations High Commissioner for Refugees (UNHCR)
United Nations Human Settlements Programme (UN-Habitat) 
United Nations Industrial Development Organization (UNIDO)
United Nations Office on Drugs and Crime (UNODC) 
United Nations Population Division (UNPD) 
United Nations Population Fund (UNFPA)
United Nations Statistics Division (UNSD)
Universal Postal Union (UPU)
World Bank
World Health Organization (WHO)
World Tourism Organization (UNWTO)
World Trade Organization (WTO)

Sessions

See also
 List of national and international statistical services

External links
 CCSA website

References 

Statistical organizations
Official statistics